Jean-Marc Luisada (born 3 June 1958) is a French pianist born in Bizerte, Tunisia. He started on the piano at six years old, "the normal age".

Biography
At the age of 16 he began studies at the Conservatoire de Paris under Dominique Merlet and Marcel Ciampi (piano) and Geneviève Joy-Dutilleux (chamber music). He has also studied with Nikita Magaloff and Paul Badura-Skoda.

In 1985, he won fifth prize at the XI International Chopin Piano Competition in Warsaw.

At 29 he had performed in Europe, the United States, and Asia and was known as a performer of "outstanding brilliance".

He signed an exclusive agreement with RCA Red Seal in 1998. Among his recordings are the waltzes and mazurkas of Chopin and the infrequently-heard chamber version of the first Chopin piano concerto, recorded with the Talich Quartet.

He is on the faculty of École Normale de Musique de Paris-Alfred Cortot. Luisada calls himself a human being of the 19th century and often mentions his love for the past and history in his music.

In October 2022, Luisada performed for first time with two of his students who are accomplished pianists, namely Singaporean pianist and Steinway Artist, Congyu Wang, and Japanese pianist and composer Hayato Sumino at the Victoria Concert Hall in Singapore. The concert was organised by Piano Island Management Pte. Ltd., a Singapore company founded by Luisada's student, Congyu Wang.

References

1958 births
Living people
Academic staff of the École Normale de Musique de Paris
20th-century French male classical pianists
21st-century French male classical pianists
Tunisian musicians
Prize-winners of the International Chopin Piano Competition
People from Bizerte
Tunisian emigrants to France